Espreso may refer to:

 Espresso
 Espreso TV